Jimmy Coates is a series of children's books written by the English author Joe Craig. The books have been published in many countries around the world and will be widely available in the United States for the first time in 2013.

The books are mostly set in the fictional dictatorship of the "Neo-Democratic State of Great Britain".

Series

Characters

Protagonists 

 Jimmy Coates – a young, genetically modified assassin
 Zafi Sauvage – another young, genetically modified assassin (Who works for the French secret intelligence)
 Mitchell Glenthorne – another young, genetically modified assassin (who works for NJ7)
 Helen Coates – Jimmy's mother
 Eva Doren – Georgie's friend who works in NJ7, but she is actually giving information to Jimmy about NJ7's plans
 Georgie Coates – Jimmy's half-sister
 Felix Muzebeke – Jimmy's best friend
 Dr. Higgins – scientist who helped to create Jimmy
 Christopher Viggo – Late Campaigner and Politician
 Saffron – Trained in the martial arts and Christopher Viggo's girlfriend

Antagonists 
 NJ7 – The fictitious government agency that pursues, and designed, Jimmy Coates
 Miss Bennett – Director of NJ7
 Paduk – Ex Director of Special Security for the Neo-Democratic State of Great Britain
 William Lee – Director of Special Security for the Neo-Democratic State of Great Britain
 Ian Coates – Jimmy's father and, later, Prime Minister of Great Britain
 Ares Hollingdale – The late and former Prime Minister of Great Britain
 Dr. Higgins – Part of the team that built Jimmy & Mitchell
 Lieutenant Commander Luke Love
 Mitchell Glenthorne – The first assassin created
 Zafi Sauvage – The French child assassin
 Uno Stovorsky – French Secret Service
 Colonel Keays – a director with the CIA and Synperco

USA release 
Shortly after the UK publication, Craig's first book was released in the United States under the title Jimmy Coates: Assassin but withdrawn shortly afterwards. During its short release, it was selected for, among others, the Lone Star reading list in Texas and the New York Public Libraries 'Books for the Teen Age' list.

The whole series was released for the first time in the USA across 2014 and 2015 by Open Road Media.

Critical reception 
The books received a variety of reviews, all positive. The Independent described the first book as
"Few books have the power to drag young boys away from their Xbox or Wii but I've seen the Jimmy Coates series in action – Super Mario is no match for this schoolboy assassin."

It was described by School Library Association as
"Packed full of shocks and surprises, high-octane action sequences, constant dangers and near-miss escapes from death, this is an at-a-sitting read for Bond and Rider fans everywhere. With bags of film potential..."

It was a finalist for the 2006 Manchester Book Award, and won the Bolton Children's Book Award 2006.

See also 
 CHERUB
 Alex Rider
 Young Bond
 Spy High
 Henderson's Boys
Spy School
Theodore Boone: Kid Lawyer

References 
 Jimmy Coates reviews
 University of Bolton – Joe Craig Wins Book Award

Notes

External links 
 
 Joe Craig's Official Website
 Joe Craig's Blog
 HarperCollins Children's Books – Joe Craig

Series of children's books
Young adult novel series
Junior spy novels
Thriller novel series